White Silence is the fifth studio album by the American rock band Cave In. The album was released on May 24, 2011 through Hydra Head Records. White Silence was listed as one of Decibel magazine's most anticipated albums of 2011.

White Silence ranked at number 17 on the US Billboard Top Heatseekers chart.

Track listing

Personnel 
White Silence personnel adapted from CD liner notes.

Cave In
 Stephen Brodsky – vocals, guitar, keyboard
 John-Robert Conners – drums, vocals, percussion, trash can
 Adam McGrath – vocals, guitar, piano, keys
 Caleb Scofield – vocals, bass guitar, guitars

Production and recording history
 Cave In – recording in 2009–2010 at Allston, Arlington, Cambridge, and Mashpee, Massachusetts & Warner, New Hampshire
 Stephen Brodsky – editing, tape manipulation, sonic manipulation
 Adam Taylor – mixing at Camp Street August–October 2010
 James Plotkin – mastering
 Q – additional percussion on "Iron Decibels"

Artwork and packaging
 Aaron Turner – artwork, design
 Faith Coloccia – design
 Adam McGrath – photographs
 John-Robert Conners – photographs

References 

2011 albums
Cave In albums
Hydra Head Records albums
Albums with cover art by Aaron Turner